Boucif Ouled Askeur  is a town and commune in Jijel Province, Algeria.

References

Communes of Jijel Province